The Xinjiang Daily (Mongolian:) is an official publication of the Xinjiang committee of the Chinese Communist Party and is published daily by Xinjiang Daily Publishing at 1 Yangzijiang Road, Saybagh District, Urumqi, Xinjiang Uyghur Autonomous Region, People's Republic of China. The newspaper is notable in that it is published in 4 languages, namely Chinese, which uses Chinese characters, Uyghur, in the Uyghur Arabic alphabet, Mongolian, in the Mongolian script and Kazakh, in the Kazakh Arabic alphabet. The newspaper includes news that focuses on the Xinjiang Uyghur Autonomous Region but also includes a small amount of national and international news.

Background

The newspaper was first published in October 1915 under the name "The Xinjiang Gazette" 新疆公报 Xīnjiāng Gōngbào. In 1918, it was renamed the "Tianshan News" 天山报 Tiānshān Bào and in 1929 it was renamed the "Tianshan Daily" 天山日报 Tiānshān Rìbào, before getting its current name in November 1935. In 1949 the newspaper became the organ of the CCP. The newspaper has had an online version since 2004.

Languages
All main content is written in Chinese and translated into the other languages. Translated articles in Uyghur, Mongolian and Kazakh take up more space than the original Chinese text. This is partly from the natural phenomenon, text expansion, common to translated material, but font sizes are also larger in the translated versions. The Chinese version typically contains 8 pages in a weekday edition, and the Uyghur, Mongolian, and Kazakh versions contain 4 pages. Since the Uyghur, Mongolian, and Kazakh versions contain fewer pages and take up more space per article, those three versions contain only a selection of the content in the Chinese version.

See also
 Tianshannet

References 

Daily newspapers published in China
Chinese-language newspapers (Simplified Chinese)
Kazakh-language newspapers
Uyghur-language mass media
Mongolian language
Mass media in Xinjiang
Chinese Communist Party newspapers